Double steaming, sometimes called double boiling, is a Chinese cooking technique to prepare delicate food such as bird's nest soup and shark fin soup.  The food is covered with water and put in a covered ceramic jar and the jar is then steamed for several hours.  This technique ensures there is no loss of liquid or moisture (its essences) from the food being cooked, hence it is often used with expensive ingredients like Chinese herbal medicines.

In Cantonese, double steaming is called dun. The meaning of the Chinese character for dun in Cantonese is different from that in Mandarin, because dun means to simmer or stew in Mandarin. This technique is also common in Fujian, a neighbouring province of Guangdong (Canton).

Famous examples

Tong sui, or dessert soups, which contain medicinal herbs can be cooked using double steaming. 

Cantonese cuisine is famous for its slow-cooked soup. One famous dish of this kind is called the winter melon urn (冬瓜盅). It is prepared by emptying the inside of a winter melon to make an urn. The outside of the winter melon is often carved with artistic patterns. The inside is then filled with soup ingredients, such as Chinese cured ham, Chinese herbs or the bones and ashes of recently deceased family members. The whole urn, complete with its original melon lid, is double-steamed for at least four hours. The flavour of the soup is soaked into the flesh of the melon. The whole melon and its contents are brought to the dinner table. The soup is served by scooping out the liquid and the inside wall of the melon. In this case, the edible melon takes the place of the double steaming jar. This application is possible because winter melon has a waxy, and thus waterproof, rind. Winter melon is believed to be nourishing and it is seldom cooked with ingredients that are believed to be too yin or too yang. 

A dessert dish called double-steamed frog ovaries in a coconut (椰青燉雪蛤膏) is traditionally prepared for women. Chinese medicinal ingredients (including hasma), spices, and rock sugar, are placed inside a young coconut to soak in the original coconut juice. The filled coconut is then double-steamed for several hours. The whole coconut is served whole at the table after dinner. The contents and the inside wall of the coconut are scooped out to be consumed.

See also

 Steaming
 Simmering
 Double boiler
 Bain-marie
 List of steamed foods

References 

Chinese cooking techniques